The 2020 Congolese protests was a series of anti-government protests and nationwide strikes against president Felix Tshisekedi and his appointment of a new judge of the Electoral Commission. Massive labour protests and increasingly violent street demonstrations was characterised by growing opposition protests and riots in Kinshasa and Katanga, the epicentre of the uprising. The mass protests led to the deaths of 1 protester.

See also
 19 January 2015 DRC protests
 December 2016 Congolese protests

References

Protests in the Democratic Republic of the Congo